Fethi Demircan (born 20 June 1938) is a Turkish professional football manager.

Managerial career
Demircan had a 60-year career in football, mostly in his native Turkey. While in military service, Demircan was an amateur footballer for İskenderun Karagücü. İstanbulspor attempted to sign him professionally, but Demircan had mandatory duty and vowed to manage since he wasn't able to play. He began his managerial career with Elazığspor in 1973, before leaving to study in a Hungarian sports academy. He then went to England for language education,  and studied sports physiology. While in England, he became a coach with West Ham United. He then received an offer to manage Galatasaray in 1975, and in his stint there won the Turkish Cup in 1976 and came second in the Süper Lig.

He then had spells in Kocaelispor, Bursaspor, and Düzcespor before managing the Turkey national football team in 1982. He continued coach in Turkey until 2001, wherein he started managing amateur teams. Throughout his career, he managed players such as Fatih Terim, Şenol Güneş, Tanju Çolak, and Metin Tekin.

Honours
Galatasaray
 Turkish Cup: 1975-76

References

External links
Mackolik Profile
TFF Manager Profile

1938 births
Living people
People from Elazığ
Turkish football managers
Turkish footballers
Turkey national football team managers
Süper Lig managers
West Ham United F.C. non-playing staff
Elazığspor managers
Galatasaray S.K. (football) managers
Boluspor managers
Kocaelispor managers
Bursaspor managers
Samsunspor managers
Eskişehirspor managers
Çaykur Rizespor managers
Malatyaspor managers
Sakaryaspor managers
Turkish expatriate sportspeople in England
Association football coaches
Association footballers not categorized by position